Leg cricket is a form of cricket played between two teams of eleven players on a circular ground with a radius between . The game is played in South Asian countries including India, Nepal, Bhutan and Sri Lanka.

Leg cricket involves using legs rather than a bat to propel the ball. The bowler rolls the ball along the ground under arm. The legsman has to kick the ball to score runs. A legsman can score four or six runs by kicking the ball out of the boundary line.

History 
Leg cricket is a recreational game. It is mainly played in India with various rules. Leg Cricket was invented  by Mr. S. Nagraj, a physical education teacher in Bangalore. He introduced this game to the school children of the town as a source of physical fitness.Mr. Jogender Prasad Verma, a Physical Education teacher in Delhi, introduced the official rule book of leg cricket in 2010. Mr. S. Nagraj is known as the father of leg cricket.  Mr. Verma is the present secretary of the International Leg Cricket Council and Leg Cricket Federation of India.

Specifications 
Leg cricket is played between two teams of 11 players. It is played on a circular ground with a radius between 80 and 120 feet.
Pitch

Boundary

Stumps

Federation 
At the international level, leg cricket is governed and promoted by the International Leg Cricket Council. 
This international body is headed by Shri Surender Kumar as President and Shri Joginder Prasad Verma as secretary general.  
In India, the Leg Cricket Federation of India is the apex governing body, which was formed in 2011. It is registered under Societies Registration Act, 1860 and affiliated with the International Leg Cricket Council. Apart from India, leg cricket is famous in Nepal, Bhutan, Sri Lanka, Florida, Ghana, and Pakistan.

Competitions 
National Championship in India: In July 2012, the Senior National T-10, Leg Cricket Championship was organised by the Leg Cricket Federation of India at Rajiv Gandhi Stadium in Bawana, Delhi where a total of 24 teams of boys and girls participated.  Sh. Surender Kumar, M.L.A. & Parliamentary Secretary to C.M., Delhi was the Chief Guest of Opening Ceremony and Satpal Singh, an Olympic wrestler and the president of the School Games Federation of India was the chief guest of second day's championship. Since 2012, the Leg Cricket Federation of India has organized 6 National games in various cities and states in India, such as Delhi, Maharashtra, Tamil Nadu, Jharkhand, Haryana, Uttar Pradesh, and Madhya Pardesh.

International Championships: India was the winner of the first Indo-Nepal T-10 Leg Cricket Series, which was held in July 2013.

The 5th National T20 leg Cricket Championship was held at Mathura in Uttar Pradesh.

In January 2017, Karnataka won by securing 211 runs, and Odisha secured 3rd position in the 5th National T10 Leg Cricket Championship, held in New Delhi. Chandan Ray is the present captain of the Indian leg cricket team.

See also 

 Kickball, a similar bat-free adaptation of baseball.
 Sport in India
 Sports in Nepal
 Sports in Bhutan
 Sport in Sri Lanka
 National Games of India
 Indian Rural Olympic Association
 School Sports and Cultural Activities Federation, India

References

External links 
 Official website of Leg Cricket Federation, India
 Official website of Indian Rural Olympic Association
 Official website of School Sports and Cultural Activities Federation-India

Forms of cricket
Sport in India
Sport in Nepal
Sports originating in South Asia
Sports originating in India